Newton Run is a tributary of Roaring Run in Wyoming County, Pennsylvania, in the United States. The stream is not designated as an impaired waterbody. The surface geology in its vicinity consists of alluvium, alluvial fan, Wisconsinan Till, and bedrock.

Course

Newton Run begins in a valley on the side of a hill in Eaton Township. It flows south-southeast for a short distance before turning south-southwest. After several tenths of a mile, the stream turns south before turning south-southwest again. After a few tenths of a mile, it turns south again and enters Monroe Township, where it turns south-southeast. A few tenths of a mile further downstream, the stream leaves its valley and turns southeast, running alongside Roaring Run for a few tenths of a mile before reaching its confluence with Roaring Run.

Hydrology
Newton Run is not designated as an impaired waterbody.

Geography and geology

The surficial geology along the lower reaches of Newton Run consists of alluvium. Further away from the stream, this is flanked Wisconsinan Till and a patch of alluvial fan. In the upper reaches, the surficial geology consists of Wisconsinan Till, and the valley sides have bedrock consisting of sandstone and shale.

Watershed

The stream is entirely within the United States Geological Survey  quadrangle of Noxen.

As of 2012, Chief Gathering LLC has a permit to construct and maintain a  natural gas pipeline and timber mat bridges crossing Newton Run and one of its unnamed tributaries.

History
Newton Run was entered into the Geographic Names Information System on August 2, 1979. Its identifier in the Geographic Names Information System is 1199222.

In the 2000s, a wind farm in Wyoming County was proposed by BP Alternative Energy, but concerns about runoff from the wind farm were expressed. Newton Run was one of several streams in the project area.

Biology
Wild trout naturally reproduce in Newton Run from its headwaters downstream to its mouth.

See also
South Branch Roaring Run, next tributary of Roaring Run going upstream
List of rivers of Pennsylvania
List of tributaries of Bowman Creek

References

Rivers of Wyoming County, Pennsylvania
Tributaries of Bowman Creek
Rivers of Pennsylvania